In physics, Ginzburg–Landau theory, often called Landau–Ginzburg theory, named after Vitaly Ginzburg and Lev Landau, is a mathematical physical theory used to describe superconductivity.  In its initial form, it was postulated as a phenomenological model which could describe type-I superconductors without examining  their microscopic properties. One GL-type superconductor is the famous YBCO, and generally all Cuprates.

Later, a  version of Ginzburg–Landau theory was derived from the Bardeen–Cooper–Schrieffer microscopic theory by Lev Gor'kov, thus showing that it also appears in some limit of microscopic theory and giving microscopic interpretation of all its parameters. The theory can also be given a general geometric setting, placing it in the context of Riemannian geometry, where in many cases exact solutions can be given. This general setting then extends to quantum field theory and string theory, again owing to its solvability, and its close relation to other, similar systems.

Introduction

By minimizing the free energy with respect to variations in the order parameter and the vector potential, one arrives at the Ginzburg–Landau equations

where j denotes the dissipation-less electric current density and Re the real part. The first equation — which bears some similarities to the time-independent Schrödinger equation, but is principally different due to a nonlinear term — determines the order parameter, ψ. The second equation then provides the superconducting current.

Simple interpretation
Consider a homogeneous superconductor where there is no superconducting current and the equation for ψ simplifies to:

This equation has a trivial solution:  . This corresponds to the normal conducting state, that is for temperatures above the superconducting transition temperature, .

Below the superconducting transition temperature, the above equation is expected to have a non-trivial solution (that is ). Under this assumption the equation above can be rearranged into:

This can be achieved by assuming the following temperature dependence of :  with :

Above the superconducting transition temperature, T > Tc, the expression (T) /  is positive and the right hand side of the equation above is negative. The magnitude of a complex number must be a non-negative number, so only  solves the Ginzburg–Landau equation.
Furthermore,   that is  approaches zero as T gets closer to Tc from below. Such a behavior is typical for a second order phase transition.

In Ginzburg–Landau theory the electrons that contribute to superconductivity were proposed to form a superfluid. In this interpretation, ||2 indicates the fraction of electrons that have condensed into a superfluid.

Coherence length and penetration depth
The Ginzburg–Landau equations predicted two new characteristic lengths in a superconductor. The first characteristic length was termed coherence length, ξ. For T > Tc (normal phase), it is given by

while for T < Tc (superconducting phase), where it is more relevant, it is given by

It sets the exponential law according to which small perturbations of density of superconducting electrons recover their equilibrium value ψ0. Thus this theory characterized all superconductors by two length scales. The second one is the penetration depth, λ. It was previously introduced by the London brothers in their London theory. Expressed in terms of the parameters of Ginzburg–Landau model it is

where ψ0 is the equilibrium value of the order parameter in the absence of an electromagnetic field. The penetration depth sets the exponential law according to which an external magnetic field decays inside the superconductor.

The original idea on the parameter κ belongs to Landau. The ratio κ = λ/ξ is presently known as the Ginzburg–Landau parameter.  It has been proposed by Landau that Type I superconductors are those with 0 < κ < 1/, and Type II superconductors those with κ > 1/.

Fluctuations in the Ginzburg–Landau model

The phase transition from the normal state is of second order for Type II superconductors, taking into account fluctuations,  as demonstrated by Dasgupta and Halperin, while for Type I superconductors it is of first order, as demonstrated by Halperin, Lubensky and Ma.

Classification of superconductors based on Ginzburg–Landau theory

In the original paper Ginzburg and Landau observed the existence of two types of superconductors depending 
on the energy of the interface between the normal and superconducting states. The Meissner state breaks down when the applied magnetic field is too large. Superconductors can be divided into two classes according to how this breakdown occurs. In Type I superconductors, superconductivity is abruptly destroyed when the strength of the applied field rises above a critical value Hc. Depending on the geometry of the sample, one may obtain an intermediate state consisting of a baroque pattern of regions of normal material carrying a magnetic field mixed with regions of superconducting material containing no field. In Type II superconductors, raising the applied field past a critical value Hc1 leads to a mixed state (also known as the vortex state) in which an increasing amount of magnetic flux penetrates the material, but there remains no resistance to the flow of electric current as long as the current is not too large. At a second critical field strength Hc2, superconductivity is destroyed. The mixed state is actually caused by vortices in the electronic superfluid, sometimes called fluxons because the flux carried by these vortices is quantized. Most pure elemental superconductors, except niobium and carbon nanotubes, are Type I, while almost all impure and compound superconductors are Type II.

The most important finding from Ginzburg–Landau theory was made by Alexei Abrikosov in 1957. He used Ginzburg–Landau theory to explain experiments on superconducting alloys and thin films. He found that in a type-II superconductor in a high magnetic field, the field penetrates in a triangular lattice of quantized tubes of flux vortices.

Geometric formulation
The Ginzburg–Landau functional can be formulated in the general setting of a complex vector bundle over a compact Riemannian manifold. This is the same functional as given above, transposed to the notation commonly used in Riemannian geometry. In multiple interesting cases, it can be shown to exhibit the same phenomena as the above, including Abrikosov vortices (see discussion below).

For a complex vector bundle  over a Riemannian manifold  with fiber , the order parameter  is understood as a section of the vector bundle . The Ginzburg–Landau functional is then a Lagrangian for that section:

The notation used here is as follows. The phenomenological parameters  and  have been absorbed so that the potential energy term is a quartic mexican hat potential; i.e., exhibiting spontaneous symmetry breaking, with a minimum at some real value . The integral is explicitly over the volume form 

for an -dimensional manifold  with determinant  of the metric tensor .

The  corresponds to the vector potential, but is in general non-Abelian when , and is normalized differently. Here, the symmetry group is SU(n), as that leaves the inner product  invariant; so here,  is a form taking values in the algebra .

The curvature  generalizes the electromagnetic field strength to the non-Abelian setting, as the curvature form of an affine connection on a vector bundle . It is conventionally written as

That is, each  is an  skew-symmetric matrix. (See the article  on the metric connection for additional articulation of this specific notation.) To emphasize this, note that the first term of the Ginzburg–Landau functional, involving the field-strength only, is

which is just the Yang–Mills action on a compact Riemannian manifold.

The Euler–Lagrange equations for the Ginzburg–Landau functional are the Yang–Mills equations 

and

Note that these are closely related to the Yang–Mills–Higgs equations.

Specific results
In string theory, it is conventional to study the Ginzburg–Landau functional for the manifold  being a Riemann surface, and taking ; i.e., a line bundle. The phenomenon of Abrikosov vortices persists in these general cases, including , where one can specify any finite set of points where  vanishes, including multiplicity. The proof generalizes to arbitrary Riemann surfaces and to Kähler manifolds. In the limit of weak coupling, it can be shown that  converges uniformly to 1, while  and  converge uniformly to zero, and the curvature becomes a sum over delta-function distributions at the vortices. The sum over vortices, with multiplicity, just equals the degree of the line bundle; as a result, one may write a line bundle on a Riemann surface as a flat bundle, with N singular points and a covariantly constant section.

When the manifold is four-dimensional, possessing a spinc structure, then one may write a very similar functional, the Seiberg–Witten functional, which may be analyzed in a similar fashion, and which possesses many similar properties, including self-duality. When such systems are integrable, they are studied as Hitchin systems.

Self-duality
When the manifold  is a Riemann surface , the functional can be re-written so as to explicitly show self-duality. One achieves this by writing the exterior derivative as a sum of Dolbeault operators .

 
The functional then becomes

The integral is understood to be over the volume form 
,
so that

is the total area of the surface . The  is the Hodge star, as before.  The degree  of the line bundle  over the surface  is 

where  is the first Chern class.

The Lagrangian is minimized (stationary) when  solve the Ginzberg–Landau equations

Note that these are both first-order differential equations, manifestly self-dual.  Integrating the second of these, one quickly finds that a non-trivial solution must obey 
.
Roughly speaking, this can be interpreted as an upper limit to the density of the Abrikosov vortecies.  One can also show that the solutions are bounded; one must have .

Landau–Ginzburg theories in string theory
In particle physics, any quantum field theory with a unique classical vacuum state and a potential energy with a degenerate critical point is called a Landau–Ginzburg theory.  The generalization to N = (2,2) supersymmetric theories in 2 spacetime dimensions was proposed by Cumrun Vafa and Nicholas Warner in November 1988; in this generalization one imposes that the superpotential possess a degenerate critical point.  The same month, together with Brian Greene they argued that these theories are related by a renormalization group flow to sigma models on Calabi–Yau manifolds.  In his 1993 paper "Phases of N = 2 theories in two-dimensions", Edward Witten argued that Landau–Ginzburg theories and sigma models on Calabi–Yau manifolds are different phases of the same theory. A construction of such a duality was given by relating the Gromov–Witten theory of Calabi–Yau orbifolds to FJRW theory an analogous Landau–Ginzburg "FJRW" theory.  Witten's sigma models were later used to describe the low energy dynamics of 4-dimensional gauge theories with monopoles as well as brane constructions.

See also

 Flux pinning
 Gross–Pitaevskii equation
 Landau theory
Stuart–Landau equation
 Reaction–diffusion systems
 Quantum vortex
 Higgs bundle
 Bogomol'nyi–Prasad–Sommerfield bound

References

Papers 

 V.L. Ginzburg and L.D. Landau, Zh. Eksp. Teor. Fiz. 20, 1064 (1950). English translation in: L. D. Landau, Collected papers (Oxford: Pergamon Press, 1965) p. 546
 A.A. Abrikosov, Zh. Eksp. Teor. Fiz. 32, 1442 (1957) (English translation: Sov. Phys. JETP 5 1174 (1957)].)  Abrikosov's original paper on vortex structure of Type-II superconductors derived as a solution of G–L equations for κ > 1/√2
 L.P. Gor'kov, Sov. Phys. JETP 36, 1364 (1959)
 A.A. Abrikosov's 2003 Nobel lecture: pdf file or video
 V.L. Ginzburg's 2003 Nobel Lecture: pdf file or video

Superconductivity
Quantum field theory
String theory
Lev Landau